Route 391, also known as Harry's Harbour Road, is a  north–south highway on the northern coast of Newfoundland in the Canadian Province of Newfoundland and Labrador. It connects the towns of Harry's Harbour and King's Point with Springdale and the Trans-Canada Highway (Route 1), via Route 390.

Route description

Route 391 begins at an intersection with Route 390 (Springdale Road) west of Springdale, just  shy of its intersection with Route 1. It winds its way northward through rural, wooded, hilly terrain for several kilometres to pass through King's Point, where it has an intersection with a local road leading to downtown and Rattling Brook. The highway now begins following the coastline as it passes through the town of Jackson's Cove-Langdon's Cove-Silverdale, with Route 391 passing through the Silverdale and Langdon's Cove parts of town while also having two intersections with a loop road to Jackson's Cove. Route 391 now passes through Nickey's Nose Cove before entering Harry's Harbour and coming to an end at a large five-fingered fork in the road.

Major intersections

References

391